Dicranoptycha fuscescens is a species of fly in the family Limoniidae.

References 

 http://eunis.eea.europa.eu/species/147818

External links 
 http://zipcodezoo.com/Animals/D/Dicranoptycha_fuscescens/

Limoniidae
Insects described in 1829